Nikola Karadjordje Vasic (born 4 October 1991) is a Swedish footballer who plays for Brommapojkarna.

Career
Vasic started his career with Bagarmossen Kärrtorp BK in the Swedish fifth division as a midfielder, before converting to a striker and scoring 17 goals. 

While playing for Huddinge IF in the fourth division, he temporarily gained nationwide fame after scoring a bicycle kick two games in a row.

In 2017, Vasic signed for Akropolis IF in the third division.

On 2 October 2020, he signed a three-year contract with Italian club Reggina. On 25 March 2021, he was loaned to Vasalunds IF. The loan has been extended on 15 July 2021.

On 25 January 2022 he left the Calabrese club. The following day he signed a 2-years contract for Brommapojkarna.

References

External links
 
 Nikola Vasic at Lagstatistik

1991 births
Swedish people of Serbian descent
Living people
Swedish footballers
Association football midfielders
Association football forwards
Enskede IK players
Huddinge IF players
Akropolis IF players
Reggina 1914 players
Vasalunds IF players
IF Brommapojkarna players
Ettan Fotboll players
Superettan players
Serie B players
Swedish expatriate footballers
Expatriate footballers in Italy
Swedish expatriate sportspeople in Italy